Andre Link (born 13 December 1994) is a German sports shooter. He competed in the men's 50 metre rifle three positions event at the 2016 Summer Olympics where he placed 5th.

References

External links
 

1994 births
Living people
German male sport shooters
Olympic shooters of Germany
Shooters at the 2016 Summer Olympics
European Games competitors for Germany
Shooters at the 2019 European Games
People from Bietigheim-Bissingen
Sportspeople from Stuttgart (region)
21st-century German people